An intangible cultural heritage (ICH) is a practice, representation, expression, knowledge, or skill considered by UNESCO to be part of a place's cultural heritage. Buildings, historic places, monuments, and artifacts are cultural property. Intangible heritage consists of nonphysical intellectual wealth, such as folklore, customs, beliefs, traditions, knowledge, and language.
Intangible cultural heritage is considered by member states of UNESCO in relation to the tangible World Heritage focusing on intangible aspects of culture. In 2001, UNESCO made a survey among States and NGOs to try to agree on a definition, and the Convention for the Safeguarding of the Intangible Cultural Heritage was drafted in 2003 for its protection and promotion.

Definition

The Convention for the Safeguarding of the Intangible Cultural Heritage defines the intangible cultural heritage as the practices, representations, expressions, as well as the knowledge and skills (including instruments, objects, artifacts, cultural spaces), that communities, groups and, in some cases, individuals recognise as part of their cultural heritage. It is sometimes called living cultural heritage, and is manifested in the following domains, among others:

 Oral traditions and expressions, including language as a vehicle of the intangible cultural heritage; 
 Performing arts; 
 Social practices, rituals and festive events; 
 Knowledge and practices concerning nature and the universe; 
 Traditional craftsmanship

Cultural heritage in general consists of the products and processes of a culture that are preserved and passed on through the generations. Some of that heritage takes the form of cultural property, formed by tangible artefacts such as buildings or works of art. Many parts of culture, however are intangible, including song, music, dance, drama, skills, cuisine, crafts and festivals. They are forms of culture that can be recorded but cannot be touched or stored in physical form, like in a museum, but only experienced through a vehicle giving expression to it. These cultural vehicles are called "Human Treasures" by the UN. The protection of languages, as the largest and most important intangible cultural heritage, should also be mentioned in this context or, according to Karl von Habsburg, President of Blue Shield International, important in the age of identity wars, because language in particular can become a target for attack as a symbolic cultural asset.

According to the 2003 Convention for the Safeguarding of the Intangible Cultural Heritage, the intangible cultural heritage (ICH) – or living heritage – is the mainspring of humanity's cultural diversity and its maintenance a guarantee for continuing creativity.  It is defined as follows:

Intangible Cultural Heritage means the practices, representations, expressions, knowledge, skills – as well as the instruments, objects, artifacts and cultural spaces associated therewith – that communities, groups and, in some cases, individuals recognize as part of their cultural heritage. This intangible cultural heritage, transmitted from generation to generation, is constantly recreated by communities and groups in response to their environment, their interaction with nature and their history, and provides them with a sense of identity and continuity, thus promoting respect for cultural diversity and human creativity. For the purposes of this Convention, consideration will be given solely to such intangible cultural heritage as is compatible with existing international human rights instruments, as well as with the requirements of mutual respect among communities, groups and individuals, and of sustainable development.

Oral history

Intangible cultural heritage is slightly different from the discipline of oral history, the recording, preservation and interpretation of historical information (specifically, oral tradition), based on the personal experiences and opinions of the speaker. ICH attempts to preserve cultural heritage 'with' the people or community by protecting the processes that allow traditions and shared knowledge to be passed on while oral history seeks to collect and preserve historical information obtained from individuals and groups.

Food heritage

With sustainable development gaining momentum as a priority of UNESCO heritage policies, an increasing number of food-related nominations are being submitted for inscription on the lists of the Convention for the safeguarding of the intangible cultural heritage. The Mediterranean diet, the traditional Mexican cuisine and the Japanese dietary culture of washoku are just some examples of this booming phenomenon.

Dance heritage
The UNESCO lists of intangible cultural heritage also include a variety of dance genres, often associated with singing, music and celebrations, from all over the world. The lists include: celebratory and ritual dances such as Ma'di bowl lyre music and Sebiba dance from Algeria and dance from Uganda and Kalbelia folk songs and dances of Rajasthan from India, and social dances such as Cuban rumba. Also, some dances are localised and practised mainly in their country of origin, such as Sankirtana, a performing art that includes drumming and singing, from India.

Other dance forms, however, even if they are officially recognised as heritage from their country of origin, are practised and enjoyed all over the world. For example, flamenco from Spain and tango, from Argentina and Uruguay, have an international dimension. Dance is a complex phenomenon, which involves culture, traditions, the use of human bodies, artefacts (such as costumes and props), as well as a specific use of music, space and sometimes light. As a result, a lot of tangible and intangible elements are combined within dance, making it a challenging but interesting type of heritage to safeguard.

Digital heritage

Digital heritage is a representation of heritage in the digital realm and is a sub-category of Intangible Cultural Heritage. It refers primarily to the use of digital media in the service of preserving cultural or natural heritage.

Oral continuity

Intangible cultural heritage is passed orally within a community, and while there may be individuals who are known tradition bearers, ICH is often broader than one individual's own skills or knowledge. A 2006 report by the government of Newfoundland and Labrador said, regarding oral culture in their area, "The processes involved in the continuation of this traditional knowledge constitute one of the most interesting aspects of our living heritage. Each member of the community possesses a piece of the shared knowledge. Crucial knowledge is passed on during community activities, frequently without any conscious attention to the process."

Preservation

Prior to the UNESCO Convention, efforts had already been made by a number of states to safeguard their intangible heritage. Japan, with its 1950 Law for the Protection of Cultural Properties, was the first to introduce legislation to preserve and promote intangible as well as tangible culture: Important Intangible Cultural Properties are designated and "holders" recognized of these craft and performance traditions, known informally as Living National Treasures. Other countries, including South Korea (Important Intangible Cultural Properties of Korea), the Philippines, Ukraine, the United States, Thailand, France, Romania, the Czech Republic, and Poland, have since created similar programs.

In 2003 UNESCO adopted the Convention for the Safeguarding of the Intangible Cultural Heritage.  This went into effect on 20 April 2006.  The Convention recommends that countries and scholars develop inventories of ICH in their territory, as well as work with the groups who maintain these ICH to ensure their continued existences; it also provides for funds to be voluntarily collected among UNESCO members and then disbursed to support the maintenance of recognized ICH. UNESCO has also created other intangible culture programs, such as a list called Proclamation of Masterpieces of the Oral and Intangible Heritage of Humanity.  This list began in 2001 with 19 items and a further 28 were listed in 2003 and another 43 in 2005. In part, the original list was seen as a way to correct the imbalance in the World Heritage List, since it excluded many Southern Hemisphere cultures which did not produce monuments or other physical cultural manifestations. It was superseded in 2008 by the UNESCO Intangible Cultural Heritage Lists.

Recently there has been much debate over protecting intangible cultural heritage through intellectual property rights, as well as the desirability to do so through this legal framework and the risks of commodification derived from this possibility. The issue still remains open in legal scholarship.

UNESCO lists by country

Note: Each country may maintain its own cultural heritage lists, items of which are not necessarily inscribed into UNESCO lists.

See also 

 Living human treasure
 Non-material culture
 UNESCO Intangible Cultural Heritage Lists

References

Further reading 

Petrillo Pier Luigi, Biocultural diversity and the Mediterranean Diet, in FAO, Sustainable diets and biodiversity, Rome 2012
 Petrillo Pier Luigi, The Legal Protection of Intangible Cultural Heritage. A comparative Perspective, Springer 2020

External links 

Definitions of Intangible Cultural Heritage as of States, IGOs and NGOs in 2001
Full text of the Convention
What Is ICH? document from Newfoundland, Canada
Exploring a Model of Living Cultural Heritage New model of Intangible heritage
Culture Quintessence Internationally oriented enterprise dedicated to the protection, appreciation and transmission of Intangible Cultural Heritage
 Dédalo. Open source software for management of Cultural Heritage (tangible and intangible) and Oral History
Intangible Spanish heritage

Cultural heritage
Traditions
Cultural anthropology
Conservation and restoration of cultural heritage
Traditional knowledge